Kruiningergors is a town in the Dutch province of South Holland. It is a part of the municipality of Voorne aan Zee, and lies about 9 km west of Maassluis.

The statistical area "Kruiningergors", which also can include the surrounding countryside, has a population of around 160.

References

Populated places in South Holland
Voorne aan Zee